

Local Businesses 
Omaha Brewing Company is located in Stewart County and owned by Omaha native Dr. Robert E. Lee and his wife, Stephanie Lee.

Omaha is an unincorporated community in Stewart County, Georgia, United States.

Geography
Omaha is located in the northwest corner of Stewart County near the juncture of the Chattahoochee River and Hannahatchee Creek.

Georgia State Route 39 is the main road through the community, leading east  to U.S. Route 27 near Louvale and south  to Georgetown.

Fitzgerald Cemetery is located about a mile outside of town.

Florence Marina State Park is located outside of Omaha.  The Roods Landing site is located south of Omaha.

History
Omaha was founded in the 1891 when the railroad arrived.

The Georgia General Assembly incorporated Ohama as a town in 1891. The town's municipal charter was dissolved in 1995.

Fort McCreary
Located one mile north of Omaha, Fort McCreary was built in 1836 for the defense of Georgia´s frontier along the Chattahoochee River. During the Creek War of 1836 it was garrisoned by U.S. soldiers and Georgia Volunteers under command of a General McClesky. A relief column from the fort saved the day for Capt. Hamilton Garmany's company of Georgia militia during a battle on the Shepherd Plantation, the most aggressive Creek attack of the war. Three unknown soldiers lie buried on the crest of the fort, which is now owned by Roanoke chapter of the Daughters of the American Revolution. A period wooden blockhouse was reconstructed at the site of Fort McCreary in 1996.

In popular culture
Omaha is mentioned in James Joyce's novel Ulysses as the fictional scene of a lynching:

The cathouse scene of The Long Riders, starring Dennis and Randy Quaid and Keith and David Carradine, was filmed in the Lee house which was located next to the Fitzgerald Cemetery until it was torn down due to disrepair some years ago.

Gallery

References 

Former municipalities in Georgia (U.S. state)
Unincorporated communities in Stewart County, Georgia
Unincorporated communities in Georgia (U.S. state)
Populated places disestablished in 1995